The 1970 USC Trojans football team represented the University of Southern California (USC) in the 1970 NCAA University Division football season. In their 11th year under head coach John McKay, the Trojans compiled a 6–4–1 record (3–4 against conference opponents), finished in a tie for sixth place in the Pacific-8 Conference (Pac-8), and outscored their opponents by a combined total of 343 to 233. The team was ranked #15 in the final AP Poll and #19 in the final Coaches Poll.

On September 12, 1970, USC opened the season visiting the University of Alabama under coach Bear Bryant and became the first fully integrated team to play in the State of Alabama.  The game, scheduled by Bryant, resulted in a 42–21 win for the Trojans. More importantly, all six touchdowns scored by USC team were by African-American players, two by USC running back Sam "Bam" Cunningham, against an all-white Crimson Tide team.  The game hastened the racial integration of football at Alabama and in the South.

Jimmy Jones led the team in passing, completing 121 of 234 passes for 1,877 yards with 10 touchdowns and 5 interceptions.  Clarence Davis led the team in rushing with 214 carries for 972 yards and nine touchdowns. Bob Chandler led the team in receiving with 41 catches for 590 yards and three touchdowns.

Schedule

Personnel

Game summaries

Alabama

Source:

Nebraska

Iowa

Oregon State

Jimmy Jones 15/21, 304 Yds, 3 TD, rush TD

Notre Dame

1970 team players in the NFL
The following players were claimed in the 1971 NFL Draft.

References

External links
 Game program: USC vs. Washington State at Spokane – November 7, 1970

USC
USC Trojans football seasons
USC Trojans football